Shahar Pe'er was the defending champion, but did not compete in the Juniors in this year.

Victoria Azarenka defeated Ágnes Szávay (6–2, 6–2) in the final.

Seeds

Draw

Finals

Top half

Section 1

Section 2

Bottom half

Section 3

Section 4

Sources
Draw

Girls' Singles
Australian Open, 2005 Girls' Singles